Ravinder Naik Dharavath (born 15 August 1952) is a member of the 14th Lok Sabha of India. He represents the Warangal constituency of Andhra Pradesh and is a member of the Bharatiya Janata Party (BJP) political party.

External links
 Home Page on the Parliament of India's Website

1952 births
Living people
People from Warangal
India MPs 2004–2009
Lok Sabha members from Andhra Pradesh
Telugu Desam Party politicians
Telangana Rashtra Samithi politicians